Tadeusz Kulczycki (born 1 January 1948) is a Polish hurdler. He competed in the men's 400 metres hurdles at the 1972 Summer Olympics.

References

1948 births
Living people
Athletes (track and field) at the 1972 Summer Olympics
Polish male hurdlers
Olympic athletes of Poland
People from Września County
Universiade bronze medalists for Poland
Universiade medalists in athletics (track and field)
Medalists at the 1973 Summer Universiade
20th-century Polish people